Oronde Ash (born 16 February 1976) is a retired footballer born in Barrouallie, St Vincent. He made a number of appearances on Saint Vincent's national team and was a member of their 1996 Gold Cup squad. Ash previously played for the NC State soccer team from 1994 to 1997 and graduated with a degree in Mass Communication. He was assistant coach for the men's soccer team at North Carolina State University from 2002 to 2007.

External links
 

1976 births
Living people
Saint Vincent and the Grenadines footballers
Saint Vincent and the Grenadines expatriate footballers
Saint Vincent and the Grenadines international footballers
1996 CONCACAF Gold Cup players
NC State Wolfpack men's soccer players
Saint Vincent and the Grenadines expatriate sportspeople in the United States
Expatriate soccer players in the United States
People from Saint Patrick Parish, Saint Vincent and the Grenadines
Association football midfielders